The Hampton Grease Band was an American rock band, beginning as a blues rock group in the late 1960s in Atlanta, Georgia, United States.  They performed with several major bands in this period, including Grateful Dead and the Allman Brothers.  The band gained a reputation for wacky stage antics, and eventually garnered enough attention to sign to Columbia Records.  They recorded a double album, Music to Eat (June 1971), which is apocryphally said to have been the second-lowest selling album in Columbia's history, second only to a yoga instructional record. This record compared with Captain Beefheart, Frank Zappa & The Mothers of Invention, and Pere Ubu.

The band then signed to Frank Zappa's Bizarre and Straight labels, but broke up in 1973.  Several of the members went on to more renowned music careers, including Glenn Phillips' solo work and Bruce Hampton's work with the Aquarium Rescue Unit. Harold Kelling formed The Starving Braineaters and continued playing with several bands in the Atlanta area. Sam Whiteside was also the road manager. Sam Whiteside and Espy Geisler designed the cover art and most of the artwork on the inside of their album Music to Eat. Music to Eat gained a significant cult following, and was re-released on CD in 1996 with several minutes of additional material that had been edited off the vinyl release.

The band was the lead-off band for Frank Zappa/Mothers last appearance at the Fillmore East on June 6, 1971. It was at this concert that Zappa and the Mothers recorded part of the Live at the Fillmore East album. Later that evening they were joined by John Lennon and Yoko Ono, also available in recorded versions.

Lead guitarist Harold Kelling died in May 2005.

The Hampton Grease Band held their first reunion concert on June 2, 2006, at the Variety Playhouse in Little Five Points, a commercial area in Atlanta, Georgia. They played the Music to Eat album but also played some covers in their two encores, including "Rock Around the Clock".

Band members
Jerry Fields (aka. Bubba Phreon) - trombone, drums, percussion, vocals
Bruce Hampton (aka. Col. Hampton B. Coles, Ret.)  - vocals, trumpet
Mike Holbrook - bass
Harold Kelling - composer, cover design, guitar, vocals
Glenn Phillips - guitar, saxophone

References

External links
CMT Band Biography
Messy Optics Performance Photos from 1960s and 70's
Ground and Sky Review of "Music To Eat"
[ All Music Review]
Creative Loafing on the Reunion Show
Hampton Grease Band web site

American blues rock musical groups
Columbia Records artists
Rock music groups from Georgia (U.S. state)
Musical groups established in the 1960s
Musical groups disestablished in 1973
1960 establishments in Georgia (U.S. state)
1973 disestablishments in Georgia (U.S. state)